MV Loch Shira is a car ferry operating on the Largs to Cumbrae route on the Firth of Clyde in western Scotland. She is owned by Caledonian Maritime Assets and operated by Calmac.

History
Built by Ferguson Shipbuilders and launched on Friday 8 December 2006, she entered service on Saturday 2 June the following year. The vessel has an absolute capacity of 32 cars and 250 passengers; however CalMac has stated that it is unlikely that more than 24 cars will be carried on the current route, in order to avoid traffic congestion both on the Isle of Cumbrae and at the Largs ferry terminal, where a busy junction is encountered just yards from leaving the boat.

On 2 April 2015 a Lego version of Loch Shira was published on the Lego ideas webpage. Calmac picked up on the Lego idea and issued a press release entitled "Block aid! CalMac ferry could become production Lego model with public support". By September of the following year the idea had not gained enough support and did not go into production.

Name
The ferry is named after the sea loch next to Inveraray at the foot Glen Shira which drains the River Shira into Loch Fyne.

Design
She has a single car deck divided into three lanes, with the central lane of sufficient width for two cars or one large commercial vehicle. There is a narrow passenger cabin at car deck level down the starboard side of the ship, with more spacious internal accommodation and open deck seating two storeys above this. The bridge sits atop the upper passenger lounge, and is offset to starboard.

In common with other Calmac "Loch Class" ferries, cars and passengers are loaded via folding ramps at either end of the vessel. These ramps make the only ship-to-shore contact during normal loading and unloading, with no ropes necessary to secure the ship. A Voith-Schneider propulsion system adds to this efficiency, giving the vessel excellent manoeuvrability.

References

External links
MV Loch Shira on www.calmac.co.uk

Caledonian MacBrayne
2006 ships
Ships built on the River Clyde